Rock Springs High School is a high school campus located in Rock Springs, Wyoming, United States.

Campus
The Rock Springs High School campus is situated at Latitude: 41.591183 Longitude: -109.20701 within the City of Rock Springs, Wyoming.

The school grounds consist of a football field with encompassing track and nearby open field, tennis courts, a student parking lot, a faculty parking lot, a front lawn, and one side access parking lot. Students are allowed to use the front lawn to sit; however, game play such as Frisbee is not allowed during school hours.

The school itself hosts a number of facilities besides the classrooms, including a swimming pool, two gymnasiums, a weights room, a cafeteria, and an Academic Learning Center. The ALC used to be the school library, but its main function has changed in recent years due to the large lab of over one hundred iMac computers now housed there. The ALC was the testing site for the 2010 PAWS assessment (formerly WYCAS), but due to technical problems, it is likely that 2010 will be the last year as well.

Notable alumni
 J. J. Syvrud, football player
Spencer West, motivational speaker and disability advocate

References

External links
Official website

Public high schools in Wyoming
Schools in Sweetwater County, Wyoming
Buildings and structures in Rock Springs, Wyoming